al-Yaarubiyah, also known as Daliha, is a village in northern Aleppo Governorate, northwestern Syria. Nearby localities include Baraghida  to the southwest and Dudiyan  to the southeast.

Demographics
In the 2004 census, al-Yaarubiyah had a population of 552. In late 19th century, traveler Martin Hartmann noted Daliha as a Turkish and Arab (Bedouin) plural village of 10 houses, then located in the Ottoman nahiyah of Azaz-i Turkman.

References

Populated places in Azaz District
Villages in Aleppo Governorate
Turkmen communities in Syria